The flag of Tiraspol is the official flag of the city of Tiraspol. Tiraspol is the capital of Transnistria, an unrecognized breakaway republic internationally recognized as part of Moldova. The current flag was approved on 14 October 2002.

Description 
The flag of the city of Tiraspol is the official symbol of the capital of Transnistria. The flag is a rectangular panel with a width-to-length ratio of 2:3, red-green in color with a diagonal stripe of blue-blue color on a white background. The blue-blue stripe symbolizes the Dniester river. The diagonal stripe is one-third the width of the flag.

The designer of the flag is A. V. Narolsky.

Symbolic meaning of colors 
The colors of the flag have the following symbolic meanings:
 Red (scarlet) — confidence, energy, strength, courage, love of life.
 Green — hope, tenderness, softness, balance, growth.
 Blue — blue- truth, truth, credibility, reliability.
 Gold (light yellow)- openness, novelty, radiance, well-being.
 White — trust, purity.

See also 
 Anthem of Tiraspol
 Coat of arms of Tiraspol

References 

Tiraspol
Tiraspol
2002 establishments in Moldova
Tiraspol